Dux, Latin for leader, could refer to anyone who commanded troops, such as tribal leaders.

Dux may also refer to:
DUX submachine gun, a line of submachine guns designed at the Oviedo Arsenal in Spain
Dux (novel), a 2002 novel by Sebastiano Vassalli
DUX (video game), a video game by HUCAST for the SEGA Dreamcast
Dux Records, Poland 
Dux Factory, a Russian aircraft factory during World War I
Duchcov or Dux in German, a town in Ústí nad Labem Region, Czech Republic
Dux, the lead melody in a canon (music)
Dux (education), the highest-ranking pupil in academic, arts or sporting achievement (Dux Litterarum, Dux Artium and Dux Ludorum respectively) in each graduating year
Dux, biography of Benito Mussolini written by Margherita Sarfatti in 1925
Oregon Ducks, the name of the University of Oregon sports teams

People with the surname
Claire Dux (1885–1967), German soprano
Frank Dux (born 1956), American martial artist
Tyson Dux (born 1978), Canadian professional wrestler

See also
Farfetch'd, a Pokémon nicknamed Dux in the original Pokémon games
Doux (disambiguation)